Cool Hipnoise is a Portuguese musical group. The band was formed in Lisbon in 1994 by Tiago Santos (guitar), João Gomes (keyboards), Paulo Muiños (saxophones), Nuno Reis (trumpet), Francisco Rebelo (bass) and Melo D (voice). Initially an acid jazz band, over the years its sound incorporated other influences like reggae and dub music. Other singers like Marga Munguambe, Orlando Santos and Milton Gulli were also part of the band. Among the artists that collaborated with the band are The Last Poets, Marta Dias, Ithaka, General D and Fernanda Abreu. Santos, Gomes and Rebelo, who remain the core of the group, have a side project named Spaceboys, with more pronounced electronic influences.

Discography
1995 - Nascer do Soul
1997 - Missão Groove
2000 - Música Exótica para FRTV
2001 - Exótica Part II and other versions
2003 - Select Cuts Showcase & More
2005 - Groove Junkies 1995-2005
2006 - Cool Hipnoise

References

External links
Official band site

Musical groups established in 1994
1994 establishments in Portugal
Portuguese hip hop groups